New Mexico State Road 21 (NM 21), is a  state highway located entirely in Colfax County in the U.S. state of New Mexico. The road starts in the center of the town of Cimarron at U.S. Route 64 (US 64) and runs southward then east to an intersection with unsigned I-25 Business (I-25 Bus.) and the western termini of US 56 and US 412 in Springer.

Route description
The road starts in the center of the town of Cimarron at the intersection of U.S. Route 64 (US 64) and Collision Avenue. It goes southward as South Collision Avenue. Leaving town limits it is called the Santa Fe Trail and passes by the well known Philmont Scout Ranch when it junctions with Cito Road and Conejo Road. On the road you can view the Tooth of Time and drive by the Villa Philmonte mansion and the Seton Memorial Library.

The road continues to drive along Philmont property until it reaches Rayado. In Rayado, the road turns south and continues past rustic ranches until it reaches a Y-intersection with the old NM 199 where NM 21 heads east towards the ranches at Miami. About  eastward of that intersection it goes underneath Interstate 25 (I-25) near exits 412 and 414. The road goes immediately into the town of Springer, where it is called West 4th Street, which is where it reaches its end at unsigned I-25 Business (I-25 Bus.) and the western termini of US 56 and US 412.

Major intersections

See also

References

External links

021
Transportation in Colfax County, New Mexico